In medicine, Piskacek's sign is an indication of pregnancy. This sign, however, may or may not be a concrete probability of pregnancy along with other signs of early pregnancy. Other signs of early pregnancy include Goodell, Hegar, von Braun Fernwald, Hartman sign and Chadwick. 

Implantation of Zygote is eccentric so that growth of uterus is unequal in early pregnancy known as Piskacek's sign.

Specifically, Piskacek's sign consists noting a palpable lateral bulge or soft prominence one of the locations where the uterine tube meets the uterus. Piskacek's sign can be noted in the seventh to eight week of gestation. Non pregnant uterus is pyriform in shape. By 12 weeks of gestation it becomes globular. In lateral implantation, there is asymmetrical enlargement of the uterus. One half of the uterus where the implantation occurred is firm while the other half is soft. This is known as Piskacek's sign.
The sign is named after Ludwig Piskaçek.

References

Medical signs
Obstetrics
Midwifery